John H. Hodgson is a political scientist.

He was for a long time custodian for an institution at Syracuse University in New York. He is one of the Western world's specialists on Russian communism, especially the Nordic sector. His Communism in Finland is a standard work on Nordic political history. He has also written a book about Otto Ville Kuusinen.

Bibliography 
 Communism in Finland (1967)
 Escape to Russia (1974)

Historians of Russia
American historians
American political scientists